Margaret Taylor Smith is an American author and social activist, and was chair of the Kresge Foundation until 1998. She received an A.B. in 1947 from Duke University, where the Margaret Taylor Smith Directorship in Women's Studies is named for her.

References

Living people
Place of birth missing (living people)
Year of birth missing (living people)
American activists
American women writers
Duke University alumni
21st-century American women